Adélaïde-Gillette Dufrénoy (née Billet) (1765–1825) was a French poet and painter from Brittany.

Biography
The daughter of Jacques Billet, a jeweller for the Crown of Poland, she had a lavish education and learnt Latin to a proficient enough level that she was able to translate the works of Horace and Virgil. A M. Laya would later introduce her to French poetry, which would capture her imagination for years to come.

At the age of fifteen, she married a rich prosecutor, Simon Petit-Dufrenoy, at the Châtelet de Paris. Her marital home became the meeting-place of the beaux-esprits of the city, which influenced her towards a true poetic vocation. In 1787, her career as a writer started in earnest with a small work titled Boutade, to a friend. Also, she had a few of her poems published in the popular poetic periodical, the Almanach des Muses. The subsequent year, she tried her hand with theatre, and put on a play, l'Amour exilé des Cieux ("Love Exiled from the Skies"), but she would owe her literary reputation to her popular elegies.

Her run of good luck ended when the French Revolution erupted and their home was set on fire, which would lead to the bankruptcy of her husband. The Directoire offered no compensation to them, and the subsequent Consulate moved him to a badly paid job in Alexandria. Adélaïde-Gillette accompanied him there and, when he went blind, tried to help him by copying his dossiers and writing out his judgements. Despite this monopolising her time, it is from this sombre period that the majority of her elegies come. The melancholy that she felt was bolstered by her feeling so far from her homeland.

Upon her husband's retiring, she returned to an uncomfortable life back in France, until, thanks to the intervention of Antoine Vincent Arnault and the Comte de Ségur, she was freed of poverty and the need for the vital necessities of life supplied by Napoléon, for whom she vowed her utmost support. Leaving trade for art, her literary career took an upturn. She started to write erotic poetry, veiled in elegy. In 1807, the first edition of her Elegies was published and was a great success, and in 1812, she sang for the King of Rome. A year later, she was part of the escort that accompanied Marie Louise of Austria to Cherbourg-en-Cotentin.

Things were looking up for Adélaïde and her husband, but once again, the tempestuous political climate of contemporary France disturbed her plans. This time, it would be the fall of the French Empire that affected her and her fellow nationals, but this time, she would manage to do well, her gift for writing becoming her family's saving grace. She wrote many children's books; edited la Minerve littéraire, l'Almanach des Dames, and l'Hommage aux Demoiselles; translated some novels from English and wrote novels of her own. She saw much of her work lauded by critics of the day and various academies; most prominently, she was awarded a prize by the Académie Française for her poem, Les Derniers Moments de Bayard ("The last moments of Bayard.").

She died in Paris on 7 March 1825, survived by her son, the geologist and mineralogist, Armand Dufrénoy.

Cultural references
 The 19th century songwriter, Pierre-Jean de Béranger, dedicated a song, La Lampe, to Adélaïde and her poetry, in which he writes 'keep shining, my lamp, keep shining still; I'm reading the poems of Dufrénoy.'

Selected works
 Abécédaire des petits gourmands, Paris, Lefuel, 1822
 Beautés de l'histoire de la Grèce moderne, ou Récit des faits mémorables des Hellènes depuis 1770 jusqu'à ce jour, Paris, A. Eymery, 1825
 Biographie des jeunes demoiselles ou vies des femmes célèbres depuis les hébreux jusqu'à nos jours, Paris, A. Eymery, 1816
 Cabinet du petit naturaliste, Paris, A. Rigaud, 1810–1819
 Élégies, suivies de poésies diverses, par Mme Dufrénoy, Paris, A. Eymery, 1813
 Étrennes à ma fille, ou Soirées amusantes de la jeunesse, Paris, A. Eymery, 1816
 Faits historiques et moraux, Paris, A. Rigaud, 1877
 Hommage aux demoiselles, Paris, Le Fuel, 1818
 L'Anniversaire de la naissance du Roi de Rome, Paris, P. Didot l'aîné, 1812
 L'Enfance éclairée, ou les Vertus et les vices, par Mme Dufrénoy, Paris, A. Eymery, 1816
 L'Hymne des Français... à S. A. R. la duchesse d'Angoulême, lors de son entrée à Paris, Paris, Brasseur aîné, 1814
 La Convalescence, élégie, Paris, J. Tastu, 1823
 La femme auteur, ou Les inconvéniens de la célébrité, Paris, Béchet, 1812
 La Petite ménagère, ou l'Éducation maternelle, Paris, A. Eymery, 1821–1822
 Le Tour du monde, ou, Tableau géographique et historique : de tous les peuples de la terre, Paris, A. Rigaud, 1814
 Les Conversations maternelles, Paris, A. Eymery, 1826
 Les Françaises, nouvelles, Paris, A. Eymery, 1818
 Nouvel Abécédaire des petits gourmands, Paris, J. Langlumé, 1837–1857
 Petite Encyclopédie de l'enfance, ou, Leçons élémentaires de grammaire, de géographie, de mythologie, d'histoire ancienne et moderne, d'histoire des religions, d'arithmétique et mathematique, de physique, d'histoire naturelle, des arts et métiers, Paris, A. Rigaud, 1817
 Plaintes d'une jeune Israélite sur la destruction de Jérusalem, élégie, Paris, A. Eymery, 1817
 Œuvres poétiques de Mme Dufrénoy, Précédées d'observations sur sa vie et ses ouvrages, par A. Jay, Paris, Moutardier, 1827

External links
 
  
 Two of her poems.
 Le premier moment de l'amour
 An exploration of Dufrénoy and 'la chaste amitié entre femmes'.
 Biography of Ours Dufrénoy

1765 births
1825 deaths
18th-century French poets
French women poets
Writers from Nantes
19th-century French poets
18th-century French journalists
19th-century French journalists